Corazza is an Italian surname. Notable people with the surname include:

Anna Maria Corazza Bildt (born 1963), Italian-Swedish politician
Simone Corazza (born 1991), Italian footballer
Vince Corazza (born 1972), Canadian-born American actor

Italian-language surnames